Mountain Home National Cemetery is a United States National Cemetery located at Mountain Home, within Johnson City in Washington County, Tennessee. Administered by the United States Department of Veterans Affairs, it encompasses , and as of 2018, had over 17,000 interments.

History
On the grounds of the Mountain Home Veterans Administration Center, the cemetery was established in 1903 as part of the National Home for Disabled Volunteer Soldiers, a federal old soldiers' home.  The cemetery features over 14,000 graves highlighted by a monument to Congressman Walter Preston Brownlow, who petitioned the government and worked tirelessly to have the veteran's center created. It officially became a National Cemetery in 1973, and has primarily the interments of veterans who died while under care at the facility.

Notable interments
 Medal of Honor recipients
 Lieutenant Frederick Clarence Buck (1843–1905), for action at the Battle of Chaffin's Farm during the Civil War
 Sergeant Henry G. Buhrman (1844–1906), for action at the Battle of Vicksburg during the Civil War
 Seaman Thomas Smith (1838–1905), for action during the Civil War
 Staff Sergeant Junior James Spurrier (1922–1984), for action in World War II
 Others
 Walter P. Brownlow (1851–1910), U.S. Representative, Tennessee's 1st district
 George Maledon (1830–1911), the "Prince of Hangmen" 
 D. C. Stephenson (1891–1966), Ku Klux Klan Grand Dragon of the Indiana Klan; later convicted for the murder of Madge Oberholtzer

References

External links
 National Cemetery Administration
 Mountain Home National Cemetery
 Cemeteries of Johnson City, Tennessee
 
 
 

Cemeteries in Tennessee
Historic American Landscapes Survey in Tennessee
Protected areas of Washington County, Tennessee
Johnson City, Tennessee
United States national cemeteries